Yousuf Adam Mahmoud or Yousef Adam (born 12 September 1972) is a Qatari-Somali former football player and manager. He is the first Qatari football manager to have coached in Africa. He also competed in the men's tournament at the 1992 Summer Olympics.

Managerial career
In 2010, Adam coached Mesaimeer SC in the Qatargas League. Later in 2010, he coached both the Somalia national team and the Somalia Olympic team. While in charge of Somalia, the team participated in the 2010 CECAFA Cup. With an average squad age of 20, Somalia lost all of its group stage matches, including 0–6 against Zambia.

Adam was unveiled as the new coach of lower-tier club Al Shahaniya in February 2013. He was named as El Jaish's new head coach on 15 January 2014.

Adam was in charge of Mesaimeer SC in the 2014–15 season, helping the club win promotion from the Qatargas League to the Qatar Stars League for the first time in its history. He left the club in May 2015. In June 2015, he was confirmed as assistant coach of Al Ahli. On 11 November 2018, he became the manager of Al Kharaitiyat.

Notes

References

External links
 
 Stats at Mundial 11

1972 births
Living people
El Jaish SC managers
Mesaimeer SC managers
Al-Shahania Sports Club managers
Qatari football managers
Somalia national football team managers
Qatari people of Somali descent
Al-Gharafa SC players
Umm Salal SC players
Al-Shamal SC players
Qatari footballers
Naturalised citizens of Qatar
Qatar international footballers
Qatar Stars League players
Qatar Stars League managers
Association football midfielders
Olympic footballers of Qatar
Footballers at the 1992 Summer Olympics
Al Kharaitiyat SC managers
Footballers at the 1998 Asian Games
2000 AFC Asian Cup players
Asian Games competitors for Qatar
Qatari expatriate football managers
Expatriate football managers in Somalia
Qatari expatriate sportspeople in Somalia
Al Ahli SC (Doha) managers
Association football coaches